Joseph Michael McGee (13 December 1904 – 4 April 1983) was a Scottish Roman Catholic clergyman who served as the Bishop of Galloway from 1952 to 1981.

Born in the parish of Monzievaird and Strowan, Perthshire, Scotland on 13 December 1904, he was ordained to the priesthood on 25 May 1929. He was appointed the Bishop of the Diocese of Galloway by the Holy See on 19 July 1952, and consecrated to the Episcopate on 11 November 1952. The principal consecrator was Cardinal William Godfrey, Archbishop of Westminster, and the principal co-consecrators were Bishop James Donald Scanlan of Dunkeld (later Archbishop of Glasgow) and Bishop Edward Wilson Douglas of Motherwell. He attended all four sessions of the Second Vatican Council from 1962 to 1965

.

He retired on 4 April 1981 and assumed the title Bishop Emeritus of Galloway. He died on 5 March 1983, aged 78.

References 

1904 births
1983 deaths
20th-century Roman Catholic bishops in Scotland
Bishops of Galloway (Roman Catholic, Post-Reformation)
Scottish Roman Catholic bishops